Anselmo Vendrechovski Júnior (September 16, 1982), known as Juninho, is a retired Brazilian professional footballer. He is a Mexican naturalized citizen.

A centre back, Juninho was known for his quality and leadership. The former captain of Tigres UANL, was a set-piece specialist with a powerful right shot and ability to score goals.

After his retirement, he stayed attached to Tigres and worked with the youth teams and with the first team's head coach Ricardo Ferretti between 2020 and 2021. Since February 9, 2023, he works as an assistant for head coach Marco Antonio Ruiz.

Career 
His great-grandparents were from Poland. He spent his early career with Coritiba. On 2005, he was signed by Botafogo. He was transferred in 2008 to São Paulo after accepting a three-year offer on December 7, 2007. In January 2009, he was released to sign back with his former club Botafogo, but Tigres UANL from Mexico offered him a better contract, and since 2010 he has played in Mexico. In early 2010 he played for Suwon Bluewings on loan. His first goal with Tigres was against Santos Laguna on a free kick in the 8th minute. This was the only goal of the game as it ended 1 - 0 for a Tigres' win. He became a key in the defense for the Apertura 2011, Apertura 2015, Apertura 2016 and Apertura 2017 championships of Tigres. After the departure of Lucas Lobos, he became the team's captain.
Juninho retired at the end of the Apertura 2018 season and began a coaching role at Tigres' youth teams. Juninho joined the Monterrey Flash of the Major Arena Soccer League in June 2022. Nowadays, he works with Tigres' head coach Marco Antonio Ruiz.

Honors

Club
Coritiba
 Paraná State League (2): 2003, 2004

Botafogo
 Rio de Janeiro State League (1): 2006
 Taça Rio (1): 2007
 Taça Guanabara (1): 2009

São Paulo
Brazilian Série A (1): 2008

UANL
 Liga MX (4): Apertura 2011, Apertura 2015, Apertura 2016, Apertura 2017
 Copa MX (1): Clausura 2014
 Campeón de Campeones (3): 2016, 2017, 2018
 Campeones Cup (1): 2018

References

External links 
 
 
 globoesporte.globo.com 
  
 

1982 births
Living people
Botafogo de Futebol e Regatas players
Suwon Samsung Bluewings players
Brazilian footballers
Brazilian expatriate footballers
Brazilian people of Polish descent
Coritiba Foot Ball Club players
São Paulo FC players
Tigres UANL footballers
Monterrey Flash players
Campeonato Brasileiro Série A players
K League 1 players
Liga MX players
Brazilian expatriate sportspeople in South Korea
Expatriate footballers in South Korea
Expatriate footballers in Mexico
Brazilian emigrants to Mexico
Naturalized citizens of Mexico
Association football defenders